Mauricie is a traditional and current administrative region of Quebec. La Mauricie National Park is contained within the region, making it a prime tourist location. The region has a land area of 35,860.05 km² (13,845.64 sq mi) and a population of 266,112 residents as of the 2016 Census. Its largest cities are Trois-Rivières and Shawinigan.

The word Mauricie was coined by local priest and historian Albert Tessier and is based on the Saint-Maurice river which runs through the region on a North-South axis.

Mauricie administrative region was created on August 20, 1997 from the split of Mauricie–Bois-Francs administrative region into Mauricie and Centre-du-Québec.  However, the concept of Mauricie as a traditional region long predates this.

Administrative divisions

Regional county municipalities
 Les Chenaux Regional County Municipality
 Maskinongé Regional County Municipality
 Mékinac Regional County Municipality

Equivalent territories
 Agglomeration of La Tuque
 Shawinigan
 Trois-Rivières

Independent municipalities
 La Bostonnais, Quebec
 Lac-Édouard, Quebec

Nation Atikamekw
 Coucoucache, Quebec
 Obedjiwan, Quebec
 Wemotaci, Quebec

Major communities
La Tuque
Louiseville
Maskinongé
Notre-Dame-du-Mont-Carmel
Saint-Alexis-des-Monts
Saint-Boniface
Saint-Étienne-des-GrèsSaint-Maurice
Saint-Tite
Sainte-Anne-de-la-Pérade
Sainte-Thècle
Shawinigan
Trois-Rivières
Yamachiche

School districts

10 Francophones:
 Centre de services scolaire du Chemin-du-Roy: 
 Trois Rivières (3 districts)
Maskinongé and 
Francheville.
 Centre de services scolaire de l'Énergie: 
Shawinigan (2 districts), 
La Tuque, 
Mékinac and 
Maskinongé.

Part of Anglophone:
 Central Quebec School Board

Notable people
 Moïsette Olier (1885–1972), writer
 Jacques Plante (1929–1986), ice hockey goaltender

References

External links

Portail de la Mauricie Official website
Tourisme Mauricie Regional tourist office
CRÉ

 
Administrative regions of Quebec